Statistics of American Soccer League II in season 1976.

League standings
Scoring system is as follows: Teams are awarded five points for a win and two points for a draw. Teams earn a bonus point for each goal scored up to three.

ASL All-Stars

Playoffs

Bracket

Division semifinals

Division finals

Championship final

References

American Soccer League II (RSSSF)

	

American Soccer League (1933–1983) seasons
2